HD 80194 (HR 3695) is a solitary star in the southern circumpolar constellation Chamaeleon. It has an apparent magnitude of 6.12, allowing it to be faintly seen with the naked eye.

HD 80194 has a stellar classification of K1 III, indicating that it is a red giant that has exhausted its core hydrogen. It is thought to be a red clump star, on the cool end of the horizontal branch and fusing helium in its core. It has 115% the mass of the Sun but has expanded to 9.82 times its girth.

References

Chamaeleon (constellation)
K-type giants
080194
045166
3695
CD-76 416
Chamaeleontis, 12